Typhlomyrmex is a genus of ants in the subfamily Ectatomminae and the sole member of the tribe Typhlomyrmecini. Known from the Neotropics, the genus has a wide distribution. Some species are restricted in range, while for example Typhlomyrmex rogenhoferi is known from southern Mexico to northern Argentina. Little is known about their biology. The genus 'Typhlomyrmex' means 'blind ant'. All species of this genus contains only blind ants.

Species
Typhlomyrmex clavicornis Emery, 1906
Typhlomyrmex foreli Santschi, 1925
Typhlomyrmex major Santschi, 1923
Typhlomyrmex meire Lacau, Villemant & Delabie, 2004
Typhlomyrmex prolatus Brown, 1965
Typhlomyrmex pusillus Emery, 1894
Typhlomyrmex rogenhoferi Mayr, 1862

References

External links

Ectatomminae
Ant genera
Hymenoptera of North America
Hymenoptera of South America